Misteri Dilaila is a 2019 Malaysian Malay-language psychological horror thriller film directed by Syafiq Yusof. The film follows a couple as the wife goes missing after the husband experiences strange events during their first night staying at the family bungalow in Fraser's Hill. Things get complicated when another woman appears and claims to be the wife.

The film was released in two versions on 21 February 2019 in Malaysia, Singapore and Brunei, making it to be the first Malaysian film to have two versions that has different alternate endings. The movie is an adaptation of the 1986 TV movie Vanishing Act which itself was based on the 1958 movie Chase A Crooked Shadow.

Viewers claimed that nearly 80 per cent of Misteri Dilaila’s storyline bore similarities to the David Green-directed film which starred Mike Farrel and Margot Kidder.

Plot 
The story follows a young couple named Jefri (Zul Ariffin) and Dilaila (Elizabeth Tan) who are on vacation at a bungalow house in Fraser's Hill, Pahang. During their first night in the house, Jefri is disturbed by strange events, only to find out the next day that his wife has gone missing. 
Jefri meets Inspector Azman (Rosyam Nor) and tells that his wife comes from a very wealthy family and the bungalow is his in-law's wedding gift to him. Jefri also explains that he is worried about his wife's disappearance since she is not a good driver, implying that she might have met with an accident. Later that night, Jefri is visited by a local Imam (Namron) who claims that Dilaila was staying with him and he has now convinced her to return to her husband. When Jefri sees Dilaila, he reveals that she is not his wife; but the girl knows details of their lives and Jefri is discredited by the evidences. Is a stranger impersonating Dilaila or is Jefri delusional?

Cast 
 Zul Ariffin as Jefri
 Elizabeth Tan as Dilaila
 Namron as Imam Aziz
 Rosyam Nor as Inspector Azman
 Sasqia Dahuri as Dilaila II
 Mas Khan as Farid
 Iz Sulaini as the photographer
 Kenji Sawahi as the banker
 Nafiez Zaidi as the Corporal Kamal

Production 
The film cost about RM 2.2 million. Filming started on 26 March 2018 and ended on 1 May 2018 in a total of 36 days, with shooting taking place on location in Fraser's Hill, Pahang and Forest Research Institute Malaysia (FRIM) in Kepong, Kuala Lumpur.

Release and reception 
Misteri Dilaila was released on February 21, 2019 in Malaysia, Singapore and Brunei.

Controversy 
The film was accused of plagiarism not long after it was screened, and fans has expressed disappointment. 80 percent of the plot is said to have similarities with the 1986 American TV film Vanishing Act that originally aired on CBS, directed by David Green and starring Mike Farrell, Margot Kidder and Fred Gwynne. The TV film itself is a loose remake of two Indian films, Sesh Anka and Puthiya Paravai, which are loosely inspired by the British classic Chase a Crooked Shadow. According to Syafiq Yusof in an interview, he stated that he took the inspiration from two South Korean films: Forgotten (2017) and Challenging.

References

External links 
 

2019 films
Films directed by Syafiq Yusof
Films about missing people
Skop Productions films
Malaysian horror films